Take It or Squeeze It is the fourth studio album by American hip hop duo The Beatnuts. It was released on March 20, 2001 via Loud Records and Epic Records. Recording sessions took place at Planet Sound Studios and Chung King Studios in New York. Produced by the Beatnuts, it features guest appearances from Marley Metal, Black Attack, Bloody Moon, Fatman Scoop, Greg Nice, Miss Loca, Problemz, Tony Touch, Triple Seis, Willie Stubz, Method Man, and former member Al' Tariq.

The album reached number 51 on the Billboard 200 and number 20 on the Top R&B/Hip-Hop Albums in the United States. It was supported with two singles:  "No Escapin' This", which peaked at No. 56 on the Hot R&B/Hip-Hop Songs and No. 12 on the Hot Rap Songs, and "Let's Git Doe", which peaked at No. 87 on the Hot R&B/Hip-Hop Songs and No. 19 on the Hot Rap Songs. The album is now out of print.

Track listing

Personnel
Lester "Psycho Les" Fernandez – vocals, producer, executive producer
Jerry "JuJu" Tineo – vocals, producer, executive producer
Berntony "Al' Tariq" Smalls – vocals (tracks: 2, 11)
Sunni Fitch – additional vocals (track 2)
Joseph "Tony Touch" Hernandez – vocals (track 3)
Marley Fernandez – vocals (tracks: 4, 11)
Chris Chandler – additional vocals (tracks: 4, 10)
Lenny Underwood – additional keyboards (tracks: 4, 10, 12)
Gregory "Greg Nice" Mays – vocals (track 5), additional vocals (track 7)
Sean "Black Attack" Boston – vocals (track 6)
M. "G-Wise" Herald – additional talkbox keyboards (track 4)
Claudette Sierra – additional vocals (track 7)
William "Willie Stubz" Lora – vocals (track 8)
Angie – additional vocals (track 8)
Isaac "Fatman Scoop" Freeman III – vocals (track 9)
Zhana – additional vocals (track 9)
C. "Miss Loca" Nieves – vocals (track 10)
Corey "Problemz" Bullock – vocals (track 11)
J. "Bloody Moon"/"Moonshine" Moronta – vocals (track 11)
Sammy "Triple Seis" Garcia – vocals (track 12)
Clifford "Method Man" Smith – vocals (track 14)
Pablo Puente – recording (tracks: 1-13)
Steve Sola – recording & mixing (track 14)
Chris Conway – mixing (tracks: 1-8, 10-13)
Doug Wilson – mixing (track 9)
David Bett – art direction
Kerry DeBruce – design
Jonathan Mannion – photography

Charts

References

External links

2001 albums
Epic Records albums
Loud Records albums
The Beatnuts albums
Albums produced by the Beatnuts
Albums recorded at Chung King Studios